The 1984 Trans America Athletic Conference men's basketball tournament (now known as the ASUN men's basketball tournament) was held March 8–10, 1984 at Spring Branch Coliseum in Houston, Texas.

Houston Baptist defeated  in the championship game, 81–76, to win their first TAAC/Atlantic Sun men's basketball tournament. The Huskies, in turn, received an automatic bid to the 1984 NCAA tournament, their first Division I tournament appearance. 

Even though Georgia State joined the TAAC for the 1983–84 season, the Panthers did not compete in the conference tournament.

Bracket

References

ASUN men's basketball tournament
Tournament
TAAC men's basketball tournament
TAAC men's basketball tournament